The Parliament House is the seat of the parliament of Sweden, the Riksdag.

Architecture
The building complex was designed by Aron Johansson in the Neoclassical style, with a centered Baroque Revival style facade section. Parliament House was constructed between 1897 and 1905.

In 1889, a competition had been held to select a design for the new Parliament building, that Johansson won. Upon opening, it replaced the Old Riksdag Building (Gamla Riksdagshuset) on Riddarholmen (island).

The two buildings of the complex were originally constructed to house the Riksdag in one, and the Sveriges Riksbank (Swedish National Bank) in the second, of a semicircular shape.

Assembly Hall expansion
After the  bicameral Riksdag was replaced by a unicameral legislature in 1971, and the bank relocated, the building housing the bank was rebuilt to house the new Assembly Hall. During the construction, the Parliament moved into temporary premises in the newly erected Kulturhuset (House of Culture) south of Sergels Torg, also in central Stockholm.

Exterior views of the

Right Livelihood Award
The Right Livelihood Award has been presented to recipients at a ceremony in Parliament House. The award was established in 1980 to honour and support those "offering practical and exemplary answers to the most urgent challenges facing us today." There presently 149 Laureates from 62 countries.

See also
 Architecture of Stockholm

References

External links

Parliament House
Parliament House
Riksdag
Riksdag
Riksdag
1905 in Sweden
Baroque Revival architecture
Parliament House
Palaces in Sweden